Ewan or Euan is a masculine given name.

Ewan may also refer to:

Ewan (surname)
Ewan, New Jersey, an unincorporated community in Gloucester County, New Jersey, United States
Ewan, Washington, an unincorporated community in Whitman County, Washington, United States
 Ewan, Ontario, a community in Peterborough County, Ontario, Canada
"Ewan", a song by APO Hiking Society
 EWAN, an abbreviation for Ethernet wide area network (WAN)